The Lilacs is an early 18th-century farmhouse located in northwestern Fairmount Park, Philadelphia. The house has a large addition constructed in the early 19th century. The name was derived from the many lilac bushes on the property.

The original owner was Morten Garret who bought a  plot of land in 1711. The farmhouse was built in two sections with the southern section constructed by Garret sometime shortly after the land was purchased. The attached section was added by Garret's descendants in 1832, as an extension from the northeast wall of the original house.

The house was owned by the Garret family until the city purchased the land in 1869 to expand Fairmount Park. A rowing club called the University Barge Club began using the house sometime after 1871 as its upstream social clubhouse along the Schuylkill River. In the 1990s, the house was used as a halfway house for juveniles.

, a sign at the driveway entrance to the house stated Outward Bound—Lilac House—3600 Greenland Drive. The same organization leases and maintains the Porter's House of the demolished Sedgeley Mansion, also in Fairmount Park on the opposite side of the river.

The Lilacs house is registered on the Philadelphia Register of Historic Places and is an inventoried structure within the Fairmount Park Historic District entry on the National Register of Historic Places.

See also

 List of houses in Fairmount Park
 National Register of Historic Places listings in West Philadelphia – an inventoried structure within the Fairmount Park listing
 Outward Bound USA

References

External links

Houses in Fairmount Park
Philadelphia Register of Historic Places
West Fairmount Park
Houses on the National Register of Historic Places in Philadelphia